Serrodes caesia is a moth of the family Erebidae first described by Warren in 1915. It is found in Indonesia (Sumatra, Sulawesi, Buru, Borneo, Java), New Guinea and Thailand. The habitat consists of alluvial forests, dipterocarp forests and primary forests.

The forewings are variegated indigo grey with black markings.

Subspecies
Serrodes caesia caesia (New Guinea)
Serrodes caesia curvilinea Prout, 1921 (Borneo, Thailand)
Serrodes caesia euryplima Prout, 1926 (Buru)
Serrodes caesia javana Roepke, 1941 (Java)

References

Moths described in 1915
Serrodes